The W. P. McGee Trophy is a national collegiate sports award, presented annually to the winner of the U Sports championship in men's basketball. The trophy is named after W. P. McGee, who served as a teacher and coach at Assumption College, with the trophy itself being donated by the University of Windsor Alumni Association in 1963. The Men's Basketball Final 8 features eight teams and 10 to 11 games played over four days at one site, which rotates year-to-year. The most recent and defending champions are the Carleton Ravens. The Ravens have the most championship wins with 17, taking 11 of the last 12 crowns, and 17 of 20 since its first title.

The 2021 championship tournaments were cancelled due to the COVID-19 pandemic.

History

The championship currently consists of an eight-team tournament, with champions from each of the four conferences, one host, an additional OUA team, an additional Canada West team and one at-large berth. The tournament first consisted of only conference champions (four or five teams) and held that format from 1963 until 1971. In 1972 and 1973, only four teams qualified, regardless of conferences. In 1974, the championship expanded to include eight teams, similar to the format seen today. That was again changed in 1983 where regional championships took place with up to 16 teams participating in up to five different cities with the national championship featuring four teams in the main host city.

In 1984, Dalhousie University hosted the championship in what would be the first of 24 straight years that Halifax, Nova Scotia would host. The format reverted to an eight team national championship in 1987, which would be the consistent format until 2004 when the tournament expanded to ten teams. The Final 10 format would last only three years, until it was again reverted to a Final 8 tournament in 2007. In 2008, the finals moved to Scotiabank Place in Ottawa for three years. After two years back in Halifax, the next two tournaments were held in the now renamed Canadian Tire Centre (formerly Scotiabank Place). The 2015 championship was hosted by Ryerson University, while the 2016 tournament was hosted by the University of British Columbia. Beginning with the 2015 championship, the tournament is played over four days. The quarterfinals are played on the Thursday, the consolation semi-finals on Friday, the consolation final and championship semi-finals on Saturday, and the bronze and gold medal games on Sunday.

Results

Rank of teams by total number of national titles

See also
 Canada Basketball
 Canadian Collegiate Athletic Association
 College basketball

References

U Sports trophies
 
Basketball trophies and awards